Ejner is a male given name. The following is a list of notable persons with that name:

Ejner Augsburg (1892 – 1971) Danish modern pentathlete
Ejner Bech (1912 – 1956) Danish racewalker
Ejner Federspiel (1896 – 1981)  Danish film actor
Ejner Johansson (1922 – 2001) Danish art historian, writer, and director
Ejner Larsen (1917-1987) Danish furniture designer

See also

Einar
Einer (disambiguation)
Ejnar

Masculine given names